Hard Bargain Farm is the former country estate and working farm of Alice and Henry Ferguson.  It is located at 2001 Bryan Point Road in Accokeek, Maryland, overlooking the Potomac River.  The property, now a smaller portion of the  they purchased, was developed by them into a "country garden".  Alice Ferguson, an artist, produced a significant body of her work here, and oversaw both the operations of the farm they established, and studied the prehistoric archaeological remains found on the property.  (The Accokeek Creek Site, now in Piscataway Park on land donated by the Fergusons, was first studied by her.)  The Fergusons established the Ferguson Foundation in 1954 to manage the property.  The foundation operates the property as an educational center focused on land stewardship and historical farming practices in the region.  The property includes a heavy timber frame tobacco barn originally constructed between about 1830 and 1850, and rebuilt in the post-American Civil War era.  Popular events include the annual Oktoberfest, and "theater in the woods" productions.

Hard Bargain Farm was listed on the National Register of Historic Places in 2014.

See also
National Register of Historic Places listings in Prince George's County, Maryland

References

External links

, including undated photo, at Maryland Historical Trust website
Hard Bargain Farm website

Accokeek, Maryland
Houses in Prince George's County, Maryland
Farms on the National Register of Historic Places in Maryland
Nature centers in Maryland
Education in Prince George's County, Maryland
National Register of Historic Places in Prince George's County, Maryland